Haymarket TMD is a railway traction maintenance depot situated inside Edinburgh, Scotland, next to Haymarket railway station and Murrayfield Stadium. The depot is operated by ScotRail. The depot code is HA.

Allocation
Class 170
Class 43 High Speed Train

References

Sources

External links

 A map location of the depot.

Transport in Edinburgh
Railway depots in Scotland